Ramat Aviv Gimel is a residential neighborhood in northwest Tel Aviv, Israel. It is considered to be an affluent area with higher than average real estate prices.  The neighborhood was planned and built in the 1970s.

Cultural references

 Ramat Aviv Gimel was a soap opera on Israeli TV in the late 1990s. 
 A luxury residential complex in Kyiv, Ukraine is modelled after Ramat Aviv Gimel.

Notable residents
Lihi Lapid
Yair Lapid

References

Neighborhoods of Tel Aviv
Upper class